The Low-country tea termite, (Glyptotermes dilatatus), also known as Low country live wood termite, is a species of damp wood termite of the genus Glyptotermes. It is endemic to high elevations Sri Lanka. It is a major pest of tea in low country area of Sri Lanka.

Importance
Termites usually attack leaves, and stems of the plant, and sometimes whole plant. Initial attack is by swarmers and they bore within the tissues and feed on internal tissues. Severe infections can give pitted appearance to bark. Destroyed heart wood produce a honeycomb appearance. Infection spread very easily throughout the field with few attacks.

Control
In tea plantations, pruning and crop sanitation is important to avoid termite attack. Usage of Gliricidia sepium, which is a shade tree in fields can provide additional host to the termite to attack. Thus economical plants can be survived. Immediate burning of affected plant parts is important to reduce spread. Planting resistant varieties is also practiced in many areas. In addition to these measures, biological control is also effective. Laboratory cultures of entomopathogenic nematodes such as Heterorhabditis species is an effective method.

Host plants
Artocarpus heterophyllus
Coffea canephora
Delonix regia
Erythrina subumbrans
Ficus amplissima
Hevea brasiliensis
Ligustrum robustum
Magnolia grandiflora
Moringa oleifera
Syzygium aromaticum
Theobroma cacao

References

External links
Some Aspects of the Biology of the Tea Termite, Glyptotermes dilatatus
Identification and substrate utilisation of fungi associated with low country live wood termite, Glyptotermes dilatatus Bugnion & Popoff and the host plant, Camellia sinensis L.O. Kuntze
Observations on the occurrence and behaviour of live-wood termites (Glyptotermes dilatatus) in low-country tea fields [Sri Lanka] 1981

Glyptotermes
Insects described in 1910
Arthropods of Sri Lanka